Keilaniemi is a district in the south-eastern part of Espoo, Finland.

Geography
Keilaniemi is bordered by the university district of Otaniemi to the north, the commercial/residential district of Tapiola to the west, the Keilalahti bay separating Espoo and Helsinki to the east, and the Gulf of Finland to the south. The distance from Keilaniemi to the centre of Helsinki along the Länsiväylä highway is about 8 km.

There are numerous islands and islets in Keilaniemi, including Fröknarna and Leppäluoto.

Offices
Keilaniemi is a high-rise business district mostly known for the numerous head offices of large corporations located there. The district includes the head offices of Tieto (in land formerly occupied by Nokia), Microsoft Finland, Kone, Fortum, Neste Oil, Valmet, and many smaller corporations such as Rovio Entertainment. The large office buildings serve as landmarks in the area. Keilaniemi rose to the position of a corporate concentration in 1976, when the Accountor Tower (formerly Fortum Head Office) was built there. The 20-storey building is still one of the tallest office buildings in Finland.

New construction
Significant new construction in Keilaniemi is planned: construction of new tower blocks for office and residential use has been approved, and there have been alterations to the ground level in the vicinity of the metro station, including the introduction of cafes, to make the area more "urban".

There are plans for four circular apartment buildings in Keilaniemi, with the highest of which having 40 storeys. The building would be 127 metres tall above sea level. Two of the other houses would have 36 storeys and the fourth would have 32 storeys. The buildings would contain a thousand new apartments. The buildings have been designed by the architecture bureau SARC and they would be constructed by SRV.

There are plans to build a 26-storey high-rise building in the area. Fortum is also building a new 16-storey building next to its original building. Other buildings in the area include Elisa, Microsoft and Kone. Life Science Center consists of five buildings of 7 to 11 storeys, containing offices of various companies. These will be accompanied with six buildings of 7 to 10 storeys, for example the Neste head office and HTC Keilaniemi were built in 2008 and 2009. There are also plans to connect Keilaniemi to the neighbouring areas of Tapiola and Otaniemi with new buildings. The Ring I beltway passing between Keilaniemi and Tapiola will go in a tunnel with a cover with a park over it. This park will serve as a recreation area for both Keilaniemi residents and inhabitants of neighbouring areas. There are also plans for new parks, a boulevard and reuse of the coast as a public space.

History
Keilaniemi belongs to the district of Otaniemi. The medieval village of Otaniemi, consisting of Keilaniemi, the current area of Tapiola and Westend, originally belonged to the lands of the Hagalund manor. Over time, the manor has been owned by the von Wright, von Numers, Sinebrychoff and Grahn families.

The ownership of the Sinebrychoff family from the 1860s to the 1920s was a particularly luxurious time at the manor. The manor served as a summer retreat for the family, which was fashionable at the time. The people wanted to go the unspoilt nature, and steam ships improved traffic connections, allowing wealthy Helsinki families to acquire summer villas at the peaceful countryside near Helsinki.

The Sinebrychoff family commissioned large-scale repair and expansion work in Hagalund. They made it into a well-kept model farmstead and also paid attention to agriculture and forestry. The family's generosity and good treatment of the workers was appreciated, and the family was known as the "good people in Hagalund". Because of this good reputation, the Sinebrychoff family was left in peace during the Finnish Civil War, unlike many other families.

When Jorvaksentie was completed in 1937, the connection to Helsinki improved substantially, causing the attention of apartment seekers to turn into the loosely-built southern Espoo, which had until then only been accessible by sea. Arne Grahn, the owner of the manor at the time, sold parts of the manor lands as zoned lots, and from the 1930s to the 1950s the manor lands became the site of the Westend villa town, the Tapiola garden city, the Helsinki University of Technology and the scientific community in Otaniemi.

Improvement of the area
The Keilaniemi area has been part of the Energizing Urban Ecosystems (EUE) research project by the research institute Tekes, aiming to develop future urban ecosystems according to the principles of sustainable development. The T3 area, consisting of Otaniemi, Keilaniemi and Tapiola, is planned to become a unique activity and development environment for universities, companies as well as the public and third sectors. The project is coordinated by RYM Oy. Other participants include SRV, Fortum, Kemira, Kone, the city of Espoo and the environmental services of the Helsinki region (HSY). Research institutes include various branches of the Aalto University and the Finnish Environment Institute (SYKE).

Transport

Keilaniemi is located at the intersection between Länsiväylä and Ring I. Keilaniemi is served by a station of the Helsinki metro. The extension (Länsimetro) was completed in 2017. The area can be accessed via all buses travelling along Länsiväylä. The area also has a bus connection via Leppävaara to western Vantaa.

The terminus of the Jokeri light rail will be built in Keilaniemi. Construction of the light rail was started in 2019 and it is projected to open for traffic in 2024.

There is also a small boat harbour in Keilaniemi.

Immediately south of Keilaniemi proper, there is the small peninsula of Karhusaari, where a 19th-century mansion, the Sinebrychoff mansion, is located. The mansion, owned by the City of Espoo, houses the Karhusaari Art Centre and is used for weddings and other events.

Panorama

See also 
 Keilaniemi metro station
 Keilaranta Tower
 Districts of Espoo

References

External links 

Districts of Espoo